The 2011 Australian motorcycle Grand Prix was the sixteenth round of the 2011 Grand Prix motorcycle racing season. It took place on the weekend of 14–16 October 2011 at the Phillip Island Grand Prix Circuit.

Australian rider Casey Stoner clinched the 2011 MotoGP World Championship with his fifth consecutive victory at his home Grand Prix on his 26th birthday. Italian rider Marco Simoncelli recorded his final podium finish at this event before being fatally injured at the following race in Malaysia.

MotoGP classification

Moto2 classification

125 cc classification
The race was stopped after 20 laps due to an accident involving Niklas Ajo.

Notes

Championship standings after the race (MotoGP)
Below are the standings for the top five riders and constructors after round sixteen has concluded.

Riders' Championship standings

Constructors' Championship standings

 Note: Only the top five positions are included for both sets of standings.

References

Australian motorcycle Grand Prix
Australian
Motorcycle
Motorsport at Phillip Island
Australian motorcycle Grand Prix